Audrey Manuela Penelope Heather Sykes (24 January 1925 – 19 September 2017) was a British Liberal Party politician who later joined the Labour Party.

Background and early life

Born to Arthur Darrel Sykes and Baroness Manuela Ottilie Von Hundelshausen, she was educated at Richmond County School for Girls and University College London. She served in the Women's Royal Naval Service during the Second World War. She worked as a lecturer, writer, and public relations adviser.

Politics
Her introduction to politics came at University College London, where she was secretary of the students union. She was a student of international affairs. She was also Vice-president of the World Federation of Liberal and Radical Youth. Sykes was a member of the executive of the World Assembly of Youth. In 1953 she was a Liberal candidate for No.7 ward in the St Pancras Metropolitan Borough Council elections.

Sykes first stood for parliament as the Liberal candidate for Finchley at the 1955 general election. Finchley was a Conservative seat that the Liberals had not won since 1923 and had not come second in since 1935. The Liberal party in 1955 was electorally at its lowest point in its history. Despite this, Sykes managed to increase the Liberal vote and save her deposit.

This performance brought her to the attention of the party nationally. When a by-election occurred in Ipswich she was chosen as the Liberal candidate. Ipswich was not promising territory for the Liberals who had not run a candidate at the two previous elections. However, the party wanted a good candidate as the by-election was expected to attract media attention as the former Liberal MP Dingle Foot was standing as the Labour candidate. She polled 21.4%, which was the highest Liberal percentage vote in Ipswich since 1929.

This result encouraged her to contest Ipswich again at the following general election rather than return to fight Finchley. She managed to improve slightly on her by-election vote share.

She started to rise to prominence in the Liberal party nationally and was elected a member of the Liberal Party Council. She was then elected as a member of the Liberal Party National Executive. She took a particular interest in the situation in South Africa and was an executive member of the Anti-Apartheid Movement. With the Liberal party experiencing something of a mini-revival she contested Ipswich for a third time at the 1964 General Election. Although she again managed to increase the Liberal vote share, she was unable to make the same sort of advance the Liberals were making elsewhere;

For the 1966 general election, Sykes switched constituencies to contest the Cornish seat of Falmouth and Camborne. Although the seat was in a part of the country where the Liberals were much stronger, she was again starting from third place. With the Liberal vote dropping slightly across the country, Sykes experienced for the first time that same shift in support;

She became disillusioned with the Liberal party but not much on policy grounds. Her only real difference came in her opposition to the Liberal policy of Britain joining the Common Market. In March 1967 she announced that she had left the Liberal party to join the Labour Party. She did not contest the 1970 general election. Two years later, she stood again as a candidate, but this time for the Labour party in Uxbridge. Labour were hoping to regain a seat they had lost to the Conservatives in 1970, and Sykes had her best chance of being elected to parliament. However, the swing of 2% she achieved was not enough to gain the seat.

She fought Uxbridge again at the following general election but again without success;

She stood down as Labour candidate and did not contest the general election eight months later and did not stand for parliament again. She did, however, stand for election to local government and was elected to Westminster City Council in 1974.

Later life
She was diagnosed with dementia and campaigned for the rights of people diagnosed with dementia. Having been placed in a care home herself, she campaigned for her right to be allowed to live in her own home. She took the case to court and in 2014 won her right to live at home.

References

External links
Ipswichstar.co.uk
Bbc.co.uk
Trebusprojects.org

1925 births
2017 deaths
Liberal Party (UK) parliamentary candidates
Labour Party (UK) parliamentary candidates
Alumni of University College London
Labour Party (UK) councillors
Councillors in the City of Westminster
Women councillors in England